The Masala Dandenong Football Club is an Australian rules football club which compete in the VAFA. The club was registered in 2012 and played its first season in 2013.

History
The club was the brainchild of Ash Nugent who had served as Team Manager of the India Tigers at the 2011 Australian Football International Cup. Nugent wanted to provide a platform for the Melbourne-based players from the team to keep playing together, whilst creating a football club that embraced diversity and encouraged new Australians to play football.

Supported by Trevor Banerjee, Fevin Mascarenhas and William Fernandes (original committee), who were all players for the Tigers at the International Cup, the club was incorporated in 2012 as the Masala Football Club and was accepted to field a side in the Club XVIII competition of the VAFA in 2013.

For its initial seasons Masala co-shared BJ Powell Reserve, Noble Park North with the Lyndale Football Club. They eventually secured their own ground at WJ Powell Reserve, Noble Park North. In 2018 the club relocated to Fotheringham Reserve, Dandenong.  In 2020 the club relocated again to Lois Twohig Reserve, Dandenong North.

In February 2019, the club was renamed and became the Masala Dandenong Football Club.

Results

References

Victorian Amateur Football Association clubs
2012 establishments in Australia
Australian rules football clubs established in 2012
Australian rules football clubs in Melbourne
Sport in the City of Greater Dandenong
Dandenong, Victoria
Indian diaspora in Australia